John Bowden Connally Jr. (February 27, 1917June 15, 1993) was an American politician. He served as the 39th governor of Texas and as the 61st United States secretary of the Treasury. He began his career as a Democrat and later became a Republican in 1973.

Born in Floresville, Texas, Connally pursued a legal career after graduating from the University of Texas at Austin. During World War II, he served on the staff of James Forrestal and Dwight D. Eisenhower before transferring to the Asiatic-Pacific Theater. After the war, he became an aide to Senator Lyndon B. Johnson. When Johnson assumed the vice presidency in 1961, he convinced President John F. Kennedy to appoint Connally to the position of United States Secretary of the Navy. Connally left the Kennedy Administration in December 1961 to run for Governor of Texas, and he held that position from 1963 to 1969. In 1963, Connally was riding in the presidential limousine when Kennedy was assassinated, and was seriously wounded. During his governorship, he was a conservative Democrat.

In 1971, Republican President Richard Nixon appointed Connally as his Treasury Secretary. In this position, Connally presided over the removal of the U.S. dollar from the gold standard, an event known as the Nixon shock. Connally stepped down from the Cabinet in 1972 to lead the Democrats for Nixon organization, which campaigned for Nixon's re-election. He was a candidate to replace Vice President Spiro Agnew after the latter resigned in 1973, but Nixon chose Gerald Ford instead. He sought the Republican nomination for president in the 1980 election, but withdrew from the race after the first set of primaries. Connally did not seek public office again after 1980 and died of pulmonary fibrosis in 1993.

Early life and education
Connally was born on February 27, 1917, into a large family in Floresville, the seat of Wilson County, southeast of San Antonio. He was one of seven children born to Lela (née Wright) and John Bowden Connally, a dairy and tenant farmer. His six siblings included four brothers: Golfrey, Merrill, Wayne and Stanford, and sisters Carmen and Blanche. Connally attended Floresville High School and was one of the few graduates who attended college. He graduated from the University of Texas at Austin, where he was the student body president and a member of the Friar Society. It was at the University of Texas where he met his future wife Nellie Connally. He subsequently graduated from the University of Texas School of Law and was admitted to the bar by examination.

Military service and legal career
Connally served in the United States Navy during World War II, first as an aide to James V. Forrestal. Subsequently he was on General Dwight D. Eisenhower's staff for planning the North African campaign. After transferring to the South Pacific Theater, he served as fighter-plane director aboard the aircraft carrier USS Essex and was awarded the Bronze Star for bravery. After being transferred to the USS Bennington, he was awarded the Legion of Merit. He was discharged in 1946 at the rank of lieutenant commander.

Connally practiced law in the Alvin Wirtz law firm, until Lyndon Baines Johnson, then a newly elected senator, persuaded him to return to Washington, to serve as a key aide. He had close ties with Johnson before his navy days and maintained them until the former president's death in 1973.

Two of Connally's principal legal clients were the Texas oil tycoon Sid W. Richardson and Perry Bass, Richardson's nephew and partner, both of Fort Worth. Richardson's empire in the 1950s was estimated at $200 million to $1 billion. Under Richardson's tutelage, Connally gained experience in a variety of enterprises and received tips on real estate purchases. The work required the Connallys to relocate to Fort Worth. When Richardson died in 1959, Connally was named to the lucrative position of co-executor of the estate.

Connally was also involved in a reported clandestine deal to place the Texas Democrat Robert Anderson on the 1956 Republican ticket as vice president. Although the idea fell through when Dwight Eisenhower retained Richard Nixon in the second slot, Anderson received a million dollars for his efforts and a subsequent appointment as U.S. Treasury Secretary.

From Navy secretary to Texas politics

At the 1960 Democratic convention in Los Angeles, Connally led supporters of Senator Lyndon Johnson. His argument that John F. Kennedy would be an unsuitable president due to having Addison's disease and a dependence on cortisone was fruitless, as Kennedy had already secured the needed delegates for nomination before the convention even opened. Kennedy made Johnson his running mate in order to secure the support of Southern Democrats, and went on to win the 1960 presidential election.

Secretary of the Navy
At Johnson's request, in 1961 President Kennedy named Connally Secretary of the Navy. Connally resigned eleven months later to run for the Texas governorship. During Connally's secretaryship, the Navy had a budget of $14 billion and more than 1.2 million workers–600,000 in uniform and 650,000 civilian–stationed at 222 bases in the United States and 53 abroad.

Connally directed the Sixth Fleet in the Mediterranean Sea on a new kind of "gunboat diplomacy." The  landed in Naples, Italy, and brought gifts to children in an orphanage. Connally also ordered gifts for a hospital in Cannes, France that treated children with bone diseases, for poor Greek children on the island of Rhodes and for spastic children in Palermo, Italy. Presents were also sent to Turkish children in Cyprus and to a camp in Beirut for homeless Palestinian refugees. The Bay of Pigs incident occurred under his watch.

Connally fought hard to protect the Navy's role in the national space program, having vigorously opposed assigning most space research to the Air Force. Time termed Connally's year as Navy Secretary "a first-rate appointment." Critics noted, however, that the brevity of Connally's tenure precluded any sustained or comprehensive achievements.

Running for governor
Connally announced in December  1961 that he was leaving the position of Secretary of the Navy to seek the Democratic nomination for the 1962 Texas gubernatorial election. He would have to compete against the incumbent Marion Price Daniel, Sr., who was running for a fourth consecutive two-year term. Daniel was in political trouble following the enactment of a two-cent state sales tax in 1961, which had soured many voters on his administration. Another opponent, Don Yarborough, was a liberal attorney from Houston favored by organized labor. Former state Attorney General Will Wilson also entered the campaign, criticizing Johnson, who he claimed had engineered Connally's candidacy.

Connally ran as a conservative Democrat. Connally waged the most active campaign of any of the Democrats, traveling more than 22,000 miles across the state. He made 43 major speeches and appeared on multiple statewide and local telecasts. Biographer Charles Ashman called Connally a "total professional" when it came to campaigning. During the campaign, Connally courted crowds and travelled with aides to make for a more noticeable entrance when he arrived at events. Ashman claimed that Connally would have aides telephone airports ask to page him for an urgent message, in order to give the impression that he was much in demand.

Eventually he was placed in a primary runoff election against Yarborough, which he won by a close vote. Connally's Republican opponent for the governor's office was conservative Republican Jack Cox, also of Houston. Connally received 847,036 ballots (54%) to Cox's 715,025 (45.6%). In the campaign, Connally made an issue of Cox having switched to the Republican party the previous year; eleven years later, Connally made the same switch.

Governor of Texas

Connally served as governor from 1963 until 1969. In the campaigns of 1964 and 1966, Connally defeated weak Republican challenges offered by Jack Crichton, a Dallas oil industrialist, and Thomas Everton Kennerly Sr. (1903–2000), of Houston, respectively. He prevailed with margins of 73.8 percent and 72.8 percent, respectively, giving him greater influence with the nearly all-Democratic legislature.

Connally was governor during a time of great expansion of higher education in Texas. He signed into law the creation of the Texas Higher Education Coordinating Board. He appointed regents who backed the entry of women into previously all-male Texas A&M University in College Station, having been prompted to take such action by State Senator William T. "Bill" Moore of Bryan, who in 1953 had first proposed the admission of women to the institution.

As governor, Connally promoted HemisFair '68, the world's fair held in San Antonio, which he suggested could net the state an additional $12 million in direct taxes. He also supported turning the fair's Texas Pavilion into a permanent museum, the Institute of Texan Cultures, describing his vision for it as "a dramatic showcase, not only to Texans, but to all the world, of the host of diverse peoples from many lands whose blood and dreams built our state."

There was some talk of Connally being selected as Hubert Humphrey's running mate on the Democratic ticket in 1968, but liberal Senator Edmund Muskie of Maine was chosen instead. Connally publicly endorsed Humphrey, but the relationship was not always smooth. According to then-Representative Ben Barnes, in a private meeting at the 1968 Democratic National Convention, Connally angrily accused Humphrey of being disloyal to President Johnson by trying to soft-pedal Johnson's position regarding Vietnam. Ashman claims that during this time Connally was "privately helping Nixon, recruiting a number of influential Texans, members of both parties, to work for the Republican candidate."

Connally was succeeded as governor by Lieutenant Governor Preston Smith.

Kennedy assassination

On November 22, 1963, Connally was seriously wounded while riding in President Kennedy's car at Dealey Plaza in Dallas when the president was assassinated. Connally, riding in the middle jump seat of the president's limousine in front of the president, recalled hearing the first shot, which he immediately recognized as a rifle shot. He said that he immediately feared an assassination attempt and turned to his right to look back to see the president. He looked over his right shoulder but did not catch the president out of the corner of his eye, so he said he began to turn back to look to his left when he felt a forceful impact to his back. He later told the Warren Commission: "I said, 'My God, they are going to kill us all. He looked down and saw that his chest was covered with blood and thought he had been fatally shot. Then he heard the third and final shot, which sprayed blood and brain tissue on the car's passengers. Connally suffered a fracture of the fifth rib, a punctured lung, a shattered wrist, and had a bullet lodged in his leg. He underwent four hours of surgery after the shooting and recovered from his wounds.

Doctor Charles Gregory, who tended to his wrist wound also told the Warren Commission that it went from the upper (dorsal) surface, near the midline, about five cm above the wrist joint, to the under (volar) surface, much closer to the joint, at a distance of about one and a half cm, and the 10-month investigation by the Warren Commission of 1963–1964 concluded that President Kennedy was assassinated by 24-year-old ex-Marine Lee Harvey Oswald and that Oswald had acted entirely alone. Connally refused to accept the single-bullet theory, which suggested that one shot passed through President Kennedy's neck and caused all of Connally's wounds. He insisted that all three shots struck occupants of the limousine. Publicly, he agreed with the Warren Commission's conclusion that Oswald acted alone.

Secretary of the Treasury

In 1971, Republican President Nixon appointed Democrat Connally as Treasury Secretary. Before agreeing to take the appointment, however, Connally told Nixon that the president must find a position in the administration for George H. W. Bush, the Republican who had been defeated in November 1970 in a hard-fought U.S. Senate race against Democrat Lloyd Bentsen. Connally told Nixon that his taking the Treasury post would embarrass Bush, who had "labored in the vineyards" for Nixon's election as president, while Connally had supported Humphrey. Nixon named Bush as ambassador to the United Nations in order to secure Connally's services at Treasury. Ben Barnes, then the lieutenant governor and originally a Connally ally, claims in his autobiography that Connally's insistence saved Bush's political career, leading to Bush's eventual presidency and indirectly to the presidency of his son, George W. Bush.

Shortly after taking the Treasury post, Connally famously told a group of European finance ministers worried about the export of American inflation that the dollar "is our currency, but your problem."
Secretary Connally defended a $50 billion increase in the debt ceiling and a $35 to $40 billion budget deficit as an essential "fiscal stimulus" at a time when five million Americans were unemployed. He unveiled Nixon's program of raising the price of gold and formally devaluing the dollar—finally leaving the old gold standard entirely, a departure begun in 1934 by Franklin D. Roosevelt. Prices continued to increase during 1971, and Nixon allowed wage and price guidelines, which Congress had authorized on a stand-by basis, to be implemented. Connally later shied away from his role in recommending the failed wage and price controls, and announced guaranteed loans for the ailing Lockheed aircraft company. He also fought a lonely battle against growing balance-of-payment problems with the nation's trading partners, and undertook important foreign diplomatic trips for Nixon through his role as Treasury Secretary.

Historian Bruce Schulman wrote that Nixon was "awed" by the handsome, urbane Texan who was also a tough political fighter. Schulman added that Henry Kissinger, Nixon's National Security Advisor, noted that Connally was the only cabinet member whom Nixon did not disparage behind his back, and that this was high praise indeed.

Democrats for Nixon and party switch

Connally stepped down as Treasury Secretary in 1972 to head "Democrats for Nixon", a Republican-funded campaign to promote Democratic support for Nixon in the 1972 presidential election. Connally's former mentor, Lyndon B. Johnson, stood behind Democratic presidential nominee George McGovern of South Dakota, although McGovern had long opposed Johnson's foreign and defense policies. It was the first time that Connally and Johnson were publicly on opposite sides of a general election campaign, although Connally had privately supported the Republican candidate Eisenhower in 1952 and 1956.

In the 1972 U.S. Senate election in Texas, Connally endorsed Democrat Harold Barefoot Sanders, later a federal judge from Dallas, rather than the Republican incumbent John Tower, also of Dallas. Connally had considered running against Tower in 1966, but chose instead to run for a third term as governor.

In January 1973, Johnson died of heart disease. He and Connally had been friends since 1938. Connally eulogized Johnson during interment services at the LBJ Ranch in Gillespie County, along with the Rev. Billy Graham, who officiated at the service.

In May 1973, Connally joined the Republican Party. When Vice President Spiro Agnew resigned five months later because of scandal, Connally was among Nixon's potential choices to fill the vacancy. However, Nixon instead tapped House Minority Leader Gerald Ford, because he believed Democrats in Congress were less likely to block Ford's appointment. Prominent Texas Democrat Bob Bullock, who had supported McGovern in 1972, disapproved strongly and publicly of Connally's switch, stating that "...I got some ideas on Mr. Connally. He ain't never done nothin' but get shot in Dallas."

Indictment, trial and acquittal
In July 1974, Connally was indicted for allegedly pocketing $10,000 from dairy industry lawyer Jake Jacobsen in exchange for influencing the government to increase federal dairy price support. At his April 1975 trial, Connally's defense called as character witnesses former First Ladies Jacqueline Kennedy and Lady Bird Johnson, as well as Texas state senator Barbara Jordan (the first female, black state senator in Texas history), Dean Rusk, Robert McNamara and Billy Graham. According to a November 1979 profile by Paul Burka in Texas Monthly magazine, "The case turned first on whether Connally would simultaneously be tried for perjury—some embarrassing inconsistencies had crept into his pretrial testimony—but his lawyer was able to prevent it, and then the issue came down to whether John Connally or Jake Jacobsen was telling the truth." On the strength of the defense's prominent character witnesses, Connally was acquitted.

1980 presidential run

Connally announced in January 1979 that he would seek the Republican nomination for President in 1980. He was considered a great orator and strong leader and was featured on the cover of Time with the heading "Hot on the Trail", but his wheeler-dealer image remained a liability. Connally drew the backing of Republican state representative Fred Agnich of Dallas. Connally raised more money than any other candidate, but he was never able to overtake the popular conservative front-runner, Ronald Reagan of California. Connally spent his money nationally, while rival candidate George H. W. Bush, also from Houston, targeted his time and money in early states and won the Iowa caucus.

Following his loss in Iowa, Connally focused on South Carolina, an early primary state in which he had the support of U.S. Senator Strom Thurmond. He lost there to Reagan 55 to 30 percent and withdrew from the contest. Despite spending $11 million during the campaign, Connally secured the support of only a single delegate, Ada Mills of Clarksville, Arkansas, who became nationally known for a brief time as the "$11 million delegate".

After withdrawing, Connally endorsed Reagan and appeared with the former governor at the Dallas-Fort Worth Airport, fundraisers and other campaign events. During a press conference, Connally was asked if he thought Reagan was the best man to be president. Connally joked, "I think he's the second best man I can think of."

In 1980, it was reported that Connally had sought the positions of Secretary of State or Secretary of Defense in the Reagan Administration, but was only offered the post of Secretary of Energy, which he turned down. In 2023, allegations by Ben Barnes, a longtime Connally associate, were published in the New York Times alleging that Connally interfered with Iran hostage crisis negotiations to aid the Reagan campaign and gain favor with Reagan. Barnes contended that during a tour of the Middle East in the summer of 1980, Connally met with several regional leaders to convince them to tell Iran that they would get a better deal from Reagan if they continued to hold hostages until after the November election. While this trip has been verified and Connally was in touch with Reagan associates, it is unclear if he was acting at anyone's direction, or if his message reached Iran or had any impact there.

Later years
In 1981, Connally was alleged to be aware of Operation Red Dog, a plot by white supremacists to overthrow the government of Dominica, by Michael Perdue. Connally, along with Ron Paul, was found to have no connection to the plot and was not subpoenaed as part of the trial.

In 1986, Connally filed for bankruptcy as a result of a string of business losses in Houston. In December 1990, Connally and Oscar Wyatt, chairman of the Coastal Oil Corporation, met with President Saddam Hussein of Iraq. Hussein had been holding foreigners as hostages (or "guests" as Hussein called them) at strategic military sites in Iraq. After the meeting, Hussein agreed to release the hostages.

In one of his last political acts, Connally endorsed Republican congressman Jack Fields of Houston in the special election called in May 1993 to fill the vacancy left by U.S. Senator Lloyd Bentsen of Houston.

Illness and death

On May 17, 1993, Connally had suffered a breathing problem and was admitted to the Houston Methodist Hospital in Houston, where he died from pulmonary fibrosis, on June 15, at the age of 76.

When Connally died, forensic pathologist Dr. Cyril Wecht and the Assassination Archives and Research Center petitioned Attorney General Janet Reno to recover the remaining bullet fragments from Connally's body, contending that the fragments would disprove the Warren Commission's single-bullet, single-gunman conclusion. The Justice Department replied that it "...would have no legal authority to recover the fragments unless Connally's family gave it permission." Connally's family refused permission.

His funeral was held on June 17, 1993 at the First United Methodist Church of Austin where he and his wife, Nellie Connally, had been members since 1963. Former President Nixon was in attendance. Connally's wife Nellie died in 2006; they are interred together at the Texas State Cemetery in Austin.

Legacy
A number of buildings and institutions in Texas bear Connally's name. Educational institutions named for him including the John B. Connally Middle School, part of Northside ISD, and John B. Connally High School, part of Pflugerville ISD. Texas A&M University and Texas State Technical College each have a building named in his honor. Other notable institutions named for him include a portion of Interstate 410 in San Antonio, the Connally Loop, and the John B. Connally Unit of the Texas Department of Criminal Justice in Karnes County. The Connally Memorial Medical Center in Floresville is named for the Connally family. Downtown Houston has a  life-sized statue of Connally in its Connally Plaza.

In January 1964, Connally donated the suit he wore on November 22, 1963, to the Texas State Library and Archives Commission (TSLAC). The suit was displayed to the public until March 1964. In 2000, TSLAC loaned the suit to the National Archives and Records Administration for examination purposes. From October 2013 to February 2014, the suit was featured as part of an exhibit at the TSLAC to commemorate the 50th anniversary of the Kennedy assassination.

See also
List of U.S. political appointments that crossed party lines
List of governors of Texas

References

Further reading
 Bergsten, C. Fred. "The Reincarnation of John Connally." The International Economy 35.3 (2021): 28-75.
 Glad, Betty, and Michael W. Link. "President Nixon's inner circle of advisers." Presidential Studies Quarterly 26.1 (1996): 13-40. online
 Reston, James. The Lone Star: The Life of John Connally (1989) online, a standard biography

Primary sources
 Connally, John with Mickey Herskowitz. In History's Shadow: An American Odyssey (Hyperion, 1993), autobiography. online

External links

The Handbook of Texas Online
Photos of John Connally
Oral History Interviews with John Connally, from the Lyndon Baines Johnson Library
Photos of Jonn Connally from University of Houston Digital Library

Booknotes interview with James Reston Jr. on The Lone Star: The Life of John Connally, December 17, 1989.

|-

|-

|-

|-

1917 births
1993 deaths
20th-century American lawyers
20th-century American politicians
20th-century Methodists
United States Navy personnel of World War II
American United Methodists
Ranchers from Texas
American shooting survivors
American victims of crime
Burials at Texas State Cemetery
Deaths from pulmonary fibrosis
Respiratory disease deaths in Texas
Democratic Party governors of Texas
Governors of Texas
Military personnel from Texas
Nixon administration cabinet members
Politicians from Austin, Texas
People from Floresville, Texas
Politicians from Fort Worth, Texas
Politicians from Houston
Politicians from San Antonio
Protestants from Texas
Recipients of the Legion of Merit
Texas lawyers
Texas Democrats
Texas Republicans
Methodists from Texas
United States Navy officers
United States Secretaries of the Navy
United States Secretaries of the Treasury
Candidates in the 1980 United States presidential election
University of Texas at Austin alumni
University of Texas School of Law alumni
Witnesses to the assassination of John F. Kennedy
New Right (United States)